Shadab Faridi is an Indian playback singer from Saharanpur, India. Shadab appeared on the Indian reality show Music Ka Maha Muqqabla A classically trained singer, Shadab's first commercial success came with "Sultan (Title Track)" in the 2016 film Sultan, starring Salman Khan.

Awards and honors

Discography

References

Living people
Indian male playback singers
Indian male composers
Musicians from Mumbai
Year of birth missing (living people)